Bruce Township is a civil township of Macomb County in the U.S. state of Michigan. As of the 2010 census, the township population was 8,700. The largely rural township is home to the Ford Motor Company Proving Grounds, which sits on six square miles of land in the western-central part of the township.

Communities
Much of the Village of Romeo lies within the township.

History
Prehistoric aborigines occupied the area periodically. There is a very prominent Indian mound that was so obvious Scottish pioneers used it as a landmark. Bruce Township was organized in 1833.

Geography

Demographics
As of the census of 2000, there were 8,158 people, 2,806 households, and 2,267 families residing in the township. The racial makeup of the township was 95.88% White, 1.79% African American, 0.37% Native American, 0.40% Asian, 0.06% Pacific Islander, 0.43% from other races, and 1.07% from two or more races. Hispanic or Latino of any race were 1.75% of the population.

There were 2,806 households, out of which 40.0% had children under the age of 18 living with them, 69.6% were married couples living together, 7.6% had a female householder with no husband present, and 19.2% were non-families. 15.9% of all households were made up of individuals, and 5.2% had someone living alone who was 65 years of age or older. The average household size was 2.90 and the average family size was 3.25.

In the township the population was spread out, with 29.1% under the age of 18, 7.3% from 18 to 24, 30.5% from 25 to 44, 24.7% from 45 to 64, and 8.5% who were 65 years of age or older. The median age was 36 years. For every 100 females, there were 102.9 males. For every 100 females age 18 and over, there were 101.4 males.

The median income for a household in the township was $65,469, and the median income for a family was $73,733. Males had a median income of $60,379 versus $31,052 for females. The per capita income for the township was $27,561. About 2.6% of families and 4.1% of the population were below the poverty line, including 5.6% of those under age 18 and 9.4% of those age 65 or over.

Notable people
Neil E. Reid, chief justice of the Michigan Supreme Court
Kid Rock, musician

References

External links

 

Townships in Macomb County, Michigan
1832 establishments in Michigan Territory
Townships in Michigan